Roque Alves de Lima Neto (8 January 1984 – 9 January 2013), commonly known as Neto Maranhão, was a Brazilian footballer. He died after suffering a heart attack during training.

Career statistics

Club

Notes

References

1984 births
2013 deaths
Brazilian footballers
Association football midfielders
Campeonato Brasileiro Série B players
Clube de Regatas Brasil players
Maranhão Atlético Clube players
Santa Cruz Futebol Clube players
Campinense Clube players
Atlético Monte Azul players
América Futebol Clube (MG) players
Salgueiro Atlético Clube players
Atlético Clube Corintians players
Treze Futebol Clube players
Associação Cultural e Desportiva Potiguar players
Association football players who died while playing
Sport deaths in Brazil